Marek Kubisz (born February 27, 1974 in Poland) is a Polish footballer who is currently playing in Szombierki Bytom.

References

1974 births
Living people
Polish footballers
Ekstraklasa players
Szombierki Bytom players
GKS Katowice players
Odra Wodzisław Śląski players
Arka Gdynia players
Unia Janikowo players
Ruch Radzionków players
Sportspeople from Chorzów

Association football forwards